This is a list of the men's athletics champions at the Olympics and World Championships in the sprint events since the introduction of the World Championships in 1983.

List of champions
Each entry has an asterisk (*) linking to the championship of that year. Yellow background is for Olympic races.

Gold medal leaders 
The top 10 gold medallists since 1983 in these events are:

References

International Olympic Committee results database
Olympic listings from IAAF 2013 statistical handbook
IAAF World Championships in Athletics. GBR Athletics. Retrieved on 2016-08-20.

Sprint (running)
Sprint champions
Athletics at the Summer Olympics
100 metres at the World Athletics Championships
200 metres at the World Athletics Championships
400 metres at the World Athletics Championships
Relays at the World Athletics Championships
Athletics sprints